Sanjay Sadashivrao Mandlik is an Indian politician and a Shiv Sena leader from Kolhapur district, Maharashtra. He is member of 17th Lok Sabha from Kolhapur Constituency. He is son of Late Shri. Sadashivrao Mandlik who was elected as a Member of Parliament four times from Kolhapur Constituency. Sanjay Mandlik is a chairman of Sadashivrao Mandlik Kagal Taluka Sahakari Sakhar Karkhana Ltd. which is located in Hamidawda in Kolhapur district.

Positions held
 2003 : Elected as president of Kolhapur District Co-operative Board
 2012: Elected as Member of Kolhapur Zilla Parishad 
 2012: Elected as a chairman of Kolhapur Zilla Parishad
 2014: Appointed as Saha-Samparkapramukh of a ShivSena Party
 2015:  Elected as director of Kolhapur District Central Cooperative Bank
 2019: Elected as Member of 17th Lok Sabha
 2022: Re-Elected as director of Kolhapur District Central Cooperative Bank

References

External links
 Shiv Sena official website

Living people
Shiv Sena politicians
People from Kolhapur district
Marathi politicians
Year of birth missing (living people)
India MPs 2019–present